The Godfather is a crime novel by American author Mario Puzo. Originally published in 1969 by G. P. Putnam's Sons, the novel details the story of a fictional Mafia family in New York City (and Long Island), headed by Vito Corleone, the Godfather. The novel covers the years 1945 to 1955 and includes the back story of Vito Corleone from early childhood to adulthood.

The first in a series of novels, The Godfather is noteworthy for introducing Italian words like consigliere, caporegime, Cosa Nostra, and omertà to an English-speaking audience.  It inspired a 1972 film of the same name. Two film sequels, including new contributions by Puzo himself, were made in 1974 and 1990.

Summary
The Corleone family, one of the Five Families of the New York Mafia, fights the other four families in a brutal war in the years after World War II. After Don Vito Corleone is shot by men working for drug kingpin Virgil "The Turk" Sollozzo, two of Corleone's sons, Santino (Sonny) and Michael, must run the family business with the help of consigliere Tom Hagen and the family's two trusted caporegimes, Peter Clemenza and Salvatore Tessio. When Michael murders Sollozzo and his bodyguard, corrupt NYPD Captain Mark McCluskey, while meeting with them in a restaurant, the conflict escalates into a full-scale war which results in Sonny's murder. Michael must return from hiding in Sicily to assume control of the family as the new Don. Under his retired father's tutelage, Michael orchestrates a plan to exact revenge, while relocating the Corleone family's power base to Las Vegas in order to further his goal of legitimizing the family and getting them out of organized crime. This encompasses the murder of all of the Corleone family's enemies, including Michael's brother-in-law Carlo Rizzi, who played a part in Sonny's murder. After selling all of the family's remaining businesses in New York, the Corleones permanently move to Las Vegas.

Main characters
The Corleone family patriarch is Vito Corleone (the Don), whose surname represents the Sicilian town of his birth, Corleone. His birth name is Vittorio Andolini, but after immigrating to the United States following the deaths of his parents and brother, he changed it to the name of his home village as one of his few acts of sentimentality. Vito fathered four children: Sonny Corleone, Fredo Corleone, Michael Corleone, and Connie Corleone. He also has an informally adopted Irish son, Tom Hagen, who became the Corleone family's consigliere (counselor). Vito Corleone is also godfather to the famous singer and movie star Johnny Fontane. The godfather referred to in the title is Vito, but the story's main character becomes Michael. The novel's central storyline details Michael's destiny to succeed his father as the head of the family empire, despite his desire to lead an Americanized life with his girlfriend (and eventual wife) Kay Adams.

The Corleone family is a criminal organization with national influence, notably protection, gambling, and union racketeering. Serving as the Don's underboss is his oldest son, Sonny. The operational side of the organization is headed by two caporegimes, Peter Clemenza and Salvatore Tessio. Other significant members of the organization include Connie's abusive husband Carlo Rizzi and enforcers Luca Brasi and Al Neri.

Reception

In The New York Times, Roger Jellinek wrote that the book was "bound to be hugely successful, and not simply because the Mafia is in the news. Mr. Puzo's novel is a voyeur’s dream, a skillful fantasy of violent personal power without consequences. The victims of the Corleone 'family' are hoods, or corrupt cops – nobody you or I would actually want to know. Just business, as Don Vito would say, not personal. You never glimpse regular people in the book, let alone meet them, so there is no opportunity to sympathize with anyone but the old patriarch, as he makes the world safe for his beloved 'family.'" The novel remained on The New York Times Best Seller list for 67 weeks and sold over nine million copies in two years.

Film adaptation

The 1972 film adaptation of the novel was released with Marlon Brando as Don Vito Corleone and Al Pacino as Michael Corleone, directed by Francis Ford Coppola. Mario Puzo assisted with both the writing of the screenplay and other production tasks. The film grossed approximately $269 million worldwide and won various awards, including three Academy Awards, five Golden Globes and one Grammy. The film is considered to be tremendously significant in cinematic history. The sequel, The Godfather Part II won six Oscars, and became the first sequel to win the Academy Award for Best Picture.

The film's plot follows the novel except for such details as backstories of some characters that are excluded, although they were filmed. Some of this footage was included in later re-edited versions such as, "The Godfather Saga." The subplot involving Johnny Fontane in Hollywood was not filmed. The most significant deviation of the film from the novel was that the latter had a more positive ending than the film in which Kay Corleone accepts Michael's decision to take over his father's business. The film ends with Kay's realization of Michael's callousness, a theme that would develop in the second and third films, which are largely not based on the original novel. Vito Corleone's backstory appeared in the second film, with his character portrayed by Robert De Niro.

Sequels
In 1984, Puzo's literary sequel to The Godfather was published. Titled The Sicilian, it chronicles the life of "Giuliano" (Salvatore Giuliano) but the Corleone family is featured heavily throughout, Michael Corleone in particular. Chronologically this story sits between Michael's exile to Sicily in 1950 and his return to the United States. For copyright reasons, the Corleone family involvement was cut from the Michael Cimino film adaptation, which is not considered part of the  Godfather film series.

In 2004, Random House published a sequel to Puzo's The Godfather, The Godfather Returns, by Mark Winegardner. A further sequel by Winegardner, The Godfather's Revenge, was released in 2006. These novels continue the story from Puzo's novel.

The Godfather Returns picks up the story immediately after the end of Puzo's The Godfather. It covers the years 1955 to 1962, as well as providing significant backstory for Michael Corleone's character prior to the events of the first novel. The events of the film The Godfather Part II all take place within the timeframe of this novel, but are only mentioned in the background. The novel contains an appendix that attempts to correlate the events of the novels with the events of the films.

The Godfather's Revenge covers the years 1963 to 1964.

Continuing Puzo's habit, as seen in The Godfather, of featuring characters who are close analogs of real-life events and public figures (as Johnny Fontane is an analog of Frank Sinatra), Winegardner features in his two Godfather novels analogs of Joseph, John F. and Robert F. Kennedy, as well as alleged organized crime figure Carlos Marcello (Carlo Tramonti). In The Godfather Returns, Winegardner also dramatizes the sweep of organized crime arrests that took place in Apalachin, New York, in 1957.

Winegardner uses all of the characters from the Puzo novels and created a few of his own, most notably Nick Geraci, a Corleone soldier who plays a pivotal role in the sequel novels. Winegardner further develops characters from the original novel, such as Fredo Corleone, Tom Hagen, and Johnny Fontane.

In 2012, a prequel based on an unproduced screenplay by Mario Puzo titled The Family Corleone, was written by Ed Falco. It tells the story of how Vito Corleone rises to Don and how Sonny Corleone and Tom Hagen enter the family business.

Literary references
The Corleone family closely resembles the Karamazov family in The Brothers Karamazov: a powerful father, an impulsive oldest son, a philosophical son, a sweet-tempered son, and an adopted stepson who is maintained as an employee. Honoré de Balzac's novel Le Père Goriot (1835) has been the inspiration for notable lines that have gained wide popularity in cinema history. Similarly, Puzo opened his 1969 novel with an epigraph popularly attributed to Balzac:  "Behind every great fortune there is a crime." The saying is most likely evolved over time from Balzac's original text: "The secret of a great success for which you are at a loss to account is a crime that has never been found out because it was properly executed."

"I'm gonna make him an offer he can't refuse" was included in both the original Puzo novel and in the film adaptation. It is the second-ranking cinematic quote included in AFI's 100 Years...100 Movie Quotes (2005) by the American Film Institute. Its origin may be from the same work to which Balzac is credited with the opening epigraph. Balzac wrote of Vautrin telling Eugene: "In that case, I will make you an offer that no one would decline."

Real-life influences
Large parts of the novel are based upon reality, notably the history of the  "Five Families", the Mafia organization in New York and the surrounding area. The novel also includes many allusions to real-life mobsters and their associates. For example, Johnny Fontane is based on Frank Sinatra, and Moe Greene on Bugsy Siegel. In addition, the character of Vito Corleone was a composite of real-life organized crime bosses Frank Costello and Carlo Gambino.

Notes and references

External links
 The Official Mario Puzo's Library entry for The Godfather
 20th-Century American Bestsellers's Entry for The Godfather

1969 American novels
The Godfather novels
Novels by Mario Puzo
G. P. Putnam's Sons books
American novels adapted into films
Novels set in the 1940s
Novels set in the 1950s
Cultural depictions of the Mafia
Third-person narrative novels
Novels set in New York City